The Florida Philosophical Association (FPA) is a philosophical organization founded in 1955 to promote philosophy in Florida. The organization sponsors an annual conference in November. Past presidents include Grayson Douglas Browning (1967), Ellen Stone Haring (1975) and Roy Weatherford (1998).

The Florida Philosophical Review is the peer-reviewed electronic journal of the FPA. It is published by the Department of Philosophy of the University of Central Florida.

References

External links 
FPA website

Philosophical societies in the United States
Organizations based in Florida
1955 establishments in Florida